Abdul Majid Muhammed is a citizen of Iran who was held in extrajudicial detention in the United States Guantanamo Bay detention camp in Cuba.

His Guantanamo Internment Serial Number was 555. Joint Task Force Guantanamo counter-terrorism analysts estimate he was born in 1978, in Zahedan, Iran.

Abdul Majid Muhammed was captured in Afghanistan and was transferred to Iran on October 11, 2006.

Press reports
The Guardian reported on March 15, 2006, that Muhammad was accused of serving as a night watchman for the Taliban.

Combatant Status Review Tribunal

Initially, the Bush Administration asserted that they could withhold all the protections of the Geneva Conventions to captives from the war on terror. This policy was challenged before the Judicial branch. Critics argued that the United States could not evade its obligation to conduct a competent tribunals to determine whether captives are, or are not, entitled to the protections of prisoner of war status.

Subsequently, the Department of Defense instituted the Combatant Status Review Tribunals. The Tribunals, however, were not authorized to determine whether the captives were lawful combatants—rather they were merely empowered to make a recommendation as to whether the captive had previously been correctly determined to match the Bush administration's definition of an enemy combatant.

Summary of Evidence memo
A Summary of Evidence memo was prepared for Abdul Majid Muhammed's Combatant Status Review Tribunal, on 3 December 2004.

Transcript
Muhammed chose to participate in his Combatant Status Review Tribunal.

His Tribunal was convened on December 10, 2004.

Tribunal documents
Lieutenant Commander Peter C. Bradford, one of the officers from the Judge Advocate General's Corps tasked to serve as a legal advisor to the CSR Tribunals, wrote a Legal Sufficiency Review, dated February 5, 2005. 

His status was considered by the 12th panel of officers sitting on Combatant Status Review Tribunal.

The president of his tribunal was a colonel in the United States Marine Corps Reserve. The JAG officer was a lieutenant colonel in the United States Army. The third member was a lieutenant colonel in the United States Air Force.

Conclusions
Abdul Majid Mujahid' CSR Tribunal concluded that he had been properly determined to have been an enemy combatant:

Abdul Majid Muhammed v. George W. Bush
A writ of habeas corpus was submitted on Abdul Majid Muhammed's behalf. The Department of Defense released a 32-page dossier of unclassified documents from his CSR Tribunal.  

A declaration from Commander Teresa M. Palmer, one of the officers from the Judge Advocate General's Corps tasked to serve as a legal advisor to the CSR Tribunals, was dated August 15, 2005.

Administrative Review Board hearing

Detainees who were determined to have been properly classified as "enemy combatants" were scheduled to have their dossier reviewed at annual Administrative Review Board hearings.

The Administrative Review Boards were not authorized to review whether a detainee qualified for POW status, and they were not authorized to review whether a detainee should have been classified as an "enemy combatant".

They were authorized to consider whether a detainee should continue to be detained by the United States because they continued to pose a threat—or whether they could safely be repatriated to the custody of their home country, or whether they could be set free.

Summary of Evidence memo
A Summary of Evidence memo was prepared for Abdul Majid Muhammed's Administrative Review Board on 12 August 2005.

The memo listed factors for and against his continued detention.

The following factors favor continued detention

The following factors favor release of transfer

Transcript
Muhammed chose to participate in his Administrative Review Board hearing.

In the Spring of 2006, in response to a court order from Jed Rakoff, the Department of Defense published an eight-page summarized transcript from his Administrative Review Board.

References

External links

 Meltdown at the Guantánamo Trials Andy Worthington
 

1978 births
Living people
People from Zahedan
Guantanamo detainees known to have been released
Iranian extrajudicial prisoners of the United States
People with borderline personality disorder